The Rights of the Terminally Ill Act 1995 (NT) was a controversial law legalising euthanasia in the Northern Territory of Australia, which was passed by the territory's Parliament in 1995. The Act was passed by the Northern Territory Legislative Assembly on 25 May 1995 by a vote of 15 to 10, received the Administrator's assent on 16 June 1995, and entered into force on 1 July 1996. A year later, a repeal bill was brought before the Northern Territory Parliament in August 1996, but was defeated by 14 votes to 11.

The effect of the law was nullified in 1997 by the federal Parliament of Australia which passed the Euthanasia Laws Act 1997. The Act continues on the Territory's statute books, however this was repealed in December 2022 with the passing of Restoring Territory Rights Act. Dr Philip Nitschke founded Exit International in response to the overturning of the Act.

While voluntary euthanasia had previously been condoned officially in the Netherlands and the US state of Oregon, the act was the first time that a legislative assembly passed a law explicitly legalising euthanasia.

Provisions of Act
The Act allowed a terminally ill patient to end their life with medical assistance, either by the direct involvement of a physician or by procurement of drugs.

The Act set out a somewhat lengthy application process, designed to ensure that a patient was both mentally competent to make the decision and in fact terminally ill. Under the Act:

 a patient had to be over 18 and be mentally and physically competent to request their own death,
 the request had to be supported by three doctors, including a specialist who confirmed that the patient was terminally ill and a psychiatrist who certified that the patient was not suffering from treatable depression,
 once the paperwork was complete, a nine-day "cooling-off period" was required before the death could proceed.

Those who assist in the ending of a person's life under the Act were immune from prosecution or other legal consequences if acting in good faith. (Sections 16 and 20).

Euthanasia was legalised in Australia's Northern Territory, by the Rights of the Terminally Ill Act 1995. It passed the Northern Territory Legislative Assembly by a vote of 15 to 10. In August 1996 a repeal bill was brought before the Parliament but was defeated by 14 votes to 11. The law was later voided by the federal Euthanasia Laws Act 1997, which is a federal law that was in effect until 13 December 2022 and prevented parliaments of territories (Specifically the Northern Territory, the Australian Capital Territory and Norfolk Island) from legalising euthanasia or assisted dying. Before the federal override occurred, three people died through physician assisted suicide under the legislation, aided by Dr Philip Nitschke. The first person was a carpenter, Bob Dent, who died on 22 September 1996.

Reaction to Act
The passage of the Bill—one of the first of its kind in the world—provoked a furor in Australia, and indeed in much of the rest of the world. The Act received both widespread support from "death with dignity" and right to die groups who saw it as a model to be followed elsewhere, and widespread condemnation from euthanasia opponents, such as right to life groups, who sought to overturn it.

Opponents also included the Australian Medical Association, and the Bishop of Darwin, Edmund John Patrick Collins.

Use of Act
While the law was in effect, four people died by suicide through its provisions.

The first was carpenter Bob Dent, 66, who died on 22 September 1996. Dent was a prostate cancer sufferer who became Australia's first person to lawfully end his life by means of physician assisted suicide. Dent, who had been suffering from prostate cancer for five years in what he called "a rollercoaster of pain", left an open letter when he died that stated: "If I were to keep a pet animal in the same condition I am in, I would be prosecuted. If you disagree with voluntary euthanasia, then don't use it, but don't deny the right to me to use it." He died with the help of Dr Philip Nitschke.

The law applied to non-residents of the Northern Territory as well, and one non-resident did take advantage of the law.  A resident of South Australia, Janet Mills, 52, came to Darwin in December 1996. She had suffered for some 10 years from a rare disease known as mycosis fungoides. She used Nitschke's device to take her life on 2 January 1997.

In addition, an anonymous 69-year-old male cancer patient used the law and Nitschke's device to die on 22 January 1997. A further two people had received approval to use the law when the law was nullified; a proposed amendment to the Voluntary Euthanasia Laws Bill allowing them to proceed did not pass.

Overturning of the Act
While some people in the Northern Territory were unhappy with the Act and campaigned for its repeal, the Northern Territory legislature was unwavering in its support. Views in the rest of Australia were much less supportive, however, and opponents began demanding that the federal parliament overturn the law, which it had the power to do since the Northern Territory does not have the same standing in Australian jurisprudence as the states. The federal parliament could not have overturned an identical state law, since the states are sovereign entities possessing legislative power in their own right. However, self-governing territories like the Northern Territory derive their power by way of a grant from the federal parliament. Consequently, the federal parliament retains the right to legislate for the territory, including the right to territory laws. In practice, it very rarely exercised that right.

On 25 March 1997, the federal parliament passed the Euthanasia Laws Act 1997, which, although not technically repealing the Rights of the Terminally Ill Act, for all practical purposes rendered it of no legal effect. Rather than repeal the Act directly, the law instead amended the Northern Territory (Self-Government) Act 1978, the act under which the Commonwealth Parliament has delegated legislative power to the Northern Territory Parliament—effectively the territory's "constitution" or "charter"—removing the Territory's constitutional power to pass any law permitting euthanasia. The Act technically remains in force in the Territory, but to the extent that it permits euthanasia it is now invalid and of no legal effect.

Although passed as a reaction to the situation in the Northern Territory, the Euthanasia Laws Act 1997 made similar amendments with respect to Australia's two other self-governing territories, the Australian Capital Territory and Norfolk Island, also preventing them from passing a law permitting euthanasia. The Euthanasia Laws Act 1997 has no effect on the power of an Australian state to pass any law permitting euthanasia, and it expressly leaves open the possibility of a territory passing laws regarding the withholding of life support.

See also
 Euthanasia device

References

External links 
 Northern Territory site on the Act - Contains links to parliamentary debates surrounding the Act as well as full texts of the Act and its nullification.

1995 in Australian law
1997 in Australian law
Euthanasia in Australia
Death in the Northern Territory
Northern Territory legislation
Euthanasia legislation
1990s in the Northern Territory